Helmuth Kulenkampff (5 December 1895 – 12 June 1971) was a physicist notable for his studies of X-rays. He obtained his PhD in 1922 under Ernst Wagner at the University of Munich with a thesis entitled: Über das Kontinuierliche Röntgenspektrum (On the continuous X-ray spectrum).

In 1937, Alfred Ehmert made the surprising observation that cosmic ray absorption in water is less than in air for same effective thickness. In 1938, Kulenkampff was the first to correctly explain this effect in terms of meson decay, and this then enabled Hans Heinrich Euler and Werner Heisenberg to calculate an improved figure for meson decay time.

References
 Laurie M. Brown and Helmut Rechenberg, The Origin of the Concept of Nuclear Forces,  IOP, 1996, p. 181.

External links
 Kulenkampff's math genealogy
 Kulenkampff family connections
 An account of Kulenkampff's opposition to the Nazi X-ray gun

1895 births
1971 deaths
20th-century German physicists